Boys and Girls Missionary Challenge (BGMC) is the missions education emphasis for children in the United States who attend churches affiliated with the General Council of the Assemblies of God. The program provides resources to help teach kids about missions and supports General Council missionaries in their fields of ministry in the United States and around the world. It is the official missions giving program of the General Council's Royal Rangers, Girls Ministries formerly known as Missionettes, and Sunday School programs, as well as Christian primary schools affiliated with the General Council.

History
In the late 1940s, executives of the Assemblies of God, staff in the Foreign Missions Department, and personnel in the Sunday School Department discussed the development of a missions education program for boys and girls 12 years of age and younger. There currently was a missions program for adults, and there was a missions program for the youth, called Speed the Light, but nothing for children. At the time, children who wanted to participate in missions giving had to become a part of one of these two programs.

Sometime in 1949, someone in the National Sunday School Department was reported to say "if children are to grow up to be adults concerned about missions, then they must be taught about missions in their formative years" and "that the not too distant future of our missionary work depends upon the vision of our children of this generation." Thus, the basis for a new children's missions education program—Boys and Girls Missionary Crusade—was established.

In October 1949, the BGMC program was launched to meet the need for literature distribution, translation work, and study material. Another need was for the disposal of the backdated literature in the [Gospel Publishing House]. At the Seventh National Sunday School Convention held in Springfield, Missouri, these two needs were brought together, and BGMC was formed as the agent. The specific purpose BGMC was to raise money through the Sunday schools for the literature program. The first task undertaken by the new BGMC program was to raise funds for shipping these materials to the mission fields.

It was also decided that a child's training must be accompanied by an opportunity for him/her to personally invest in missions. The Division of Foreign Missions (now Assemblies of God World Missions) had indicated that the missionaries' current greatest need was for gospel literature. At the time, the Assemblies of God had printing plants in South Africa, Brazil, Peru, the Gold Coast, and other fields. Yet funds for translation and printing were limited. It was to be understood that all the money received by BGMC would be used entirely in the translation and production of gospel literature in the foreign fields.

BGMC was first introduced at the General Council meeting in Seattle, Washington, in September 1949. About the same time, a general letter was sent out to all churches. Immediately, 145 churches joined the BGMC program that same month. The number increased to 229 total charter members. Barrel banks were chosen as the collection containers since everything sent to the foreign field at that time was packed in sturdy wooden barrels. This evolved into "Buddy Barrel" becoming the mascot or symbol for BGMC. Buddy Barrel became the animated representation of the small barrel banks.

It was also decided that small wooden barrels would be given to all the Sunday schools, who wished to cooperate with the program, in sufficient quantity so that every boy and girl in the Sunday school would receive a barrel. The child was to take the barrel home and each day place a penny, nickel, dime or more in it. Once a month on the designated Sunday, each pupil would return his/her barrel to Sunday school.

In 2005, the program had raised 5.38 million dollars for the calendar year, for a grand total of 72.8 million dollars since the program's inception.

In 2007, BGMC is changing its name from Boys and Girls Missionary Crusade to Boys and Girls Missionary Challenge

How BGMC Works

Source of BGMC Funding
Young children giving in "Buddy Barrels" 
Older children making faith promises 
Parents and other adults receiving special offerings

Target of BGMC Funding
General Council Foreign Missionaries (for ministry supplies that relate specifically to evangelism and discipleship):
Puppets, music, and video tapes 
Tracts, Bibles, and literature 
Sound systems, computers, and copy machines

Foreign Missions Organizations:
International Media Ministries
Global University
The Christian Training Network
Generation XXI
Resource and Development Ministries (RDM)
STAR Radio Avance
Center for Muslim Ministries
HealthCare Ministries
Teen Challenge International

General Council Home Missionaries and Missions Organizations:
Chi Alpha Campus Ministries
Institutional/Occupational Chaplaincy
Intercultural Ministries
Military Chaplaincy
Teen Challenge
Church Planting (provides each new church plant with $400.00 in start-up funds plus $75.00 each quarter for the first year for Sunday school materials)
A percentage given back to General Council districts to use for their domestic missions projects

Program Milestones
1957 First awards/trophies were given to honor amounts given by churches 
1959 BGMC yearly giving reaches the $100,000 mark 
1963 BGMC total giving reaches the one million mark 
1971 Frances Foster retires after being the BGMC coordinator for 21 years 
1977 Helen Rye resigned and Sandy Askew was named BGMC coordinator 
1979 Plastic Buddy Barrels were introduced 
1982 BGMC total giving reaches the ten million mark 
1984 BGMC yearly giving reaches the one million mark 
1985 Pencil Pal introduced 
1987 New plastic Buddy barrels with plastic caps were introduced 
1989 Winnie the World was introduced 
1990 BGMC total giving reaches the twenty million mark 
1991 Sandy Askew went full-time as the National BGMC Coordinator 
1992 BGMC yearly giving reaches the two million mark  
1995 BGMC total giving reaches the thirty million mark 
1998 BGMC yearly giving reaches the three million mark 
1998 BGMC total giving reaches the forty million mark  
1999 BGMC quarterly missions packets are replaced with an annual manual 
1999 Buddy Barrel celebrates his 50th Birthday 
1999 Sandy Askew retires after 22 years, David and Mary Boyd become the new National BGMC Coordinators 
1999 The National Children's Ministries Agency is created and BGMC becomes a part of this agency. David and Mary Boyd are the National Directors. 
2001 The Executive Presbytery votes to make BGMC the missions education program for children in the Assemblies of God 
2001 Royal Rangers, Missionettes, and Christian Schools adopt BGMC into their programs.

External links
BGMC Official Website
BGMC Kids Official Website (games, videos, and missions stories for kids)

References
  BGMC Giving Statistics

Assemblies of God
Pentecostalism in the United States